The following is the official canvassing of votes by the Congress of the Philippines for the 2004 Philippine presidential election.

Presidential election

Absentee voters

References

2004 in the Philippines
2004 Philippine presidential election